The Peak Downs Highway links the towns of Mackay and Clermont in the Australian state of Queensland. It represents the main link between Queensland's Whitsunday Coast and the Central West region of the state. Major settlements served by this route include Walkerston, Nebo, Moranbah ( north of the highway, but the largest town along the route) and Clermont.

The ABC has described the road as "crucial to the national economy" but, reporting 550 crashes in 10 years, said that it had been likened to roads in the Third World. "Someone is killed or seriously injured on the Peak Downs Highway on average about once every two-and-a-half weeks," it said. In December 2019 Mackay's Daily Mercury reported that 49 people had been killed and more than 1000 injured on the highway.

Highway conditions
The highway is notorious for the extremely dangerous conditions caused by its service as a primary access route for workers, fuel, machinery and other supplies to the coal mines of the Bowen Basin. The narrow two-lane highway is often congested with oversize loads (e.g. mining haul-trucks, dozers and excavators, tyres and buckets) and road trains, which presents a significant hazard and frustration to fatigued long-haul commuters (Drive-in, Drive-out mine workers) on the road.

Northern Australia Roads Program upgrade
The Northern Australia Roads Program announced in 2016 included the following project for the Peak Downs Highway.

Pavement widening and strengthening
Completion of a project for pavement widening and strengthening between Clermont and Nebo had in June 2021 been expected in late 2022 at a total cost of $35 million. As of March 2023, roadworks of various kinds, some resurfacing, some more  in depth, are ongoing in places, while others are relatively untouched, and the risk of death or serious injury to the highway’s users remains.

Other upgrades

Eton Range realignment
A project to realign and upgrade the road on the Eton Range, at a cost of $189.26 million, was completed in October 2020.

Rehabilitate and widen
A project to rehabilitate and widen  of highway near Wolfgang Road, at a cost of $11.5 million, was completed in March 2022.

Road safety improvements
A project to improve road safety between Eton and Mackay, at a cost of $18 million, was due to finish in late 2021.

Walkerston bypass
A project to construct a bypass of Walkerston, at a cost of $186.6 million, was expected to be complete by mid to late 2024.

Major intersections

See also

 Highways in Australia
 List of highways in Queensland

References

External links 

Highways in Queensland
Mackay, Queensland